Hadriania or Hadrianeia was a town of ancient Mysia. It was the seat of a bishop from an early date. No longer a residential see, it remains a titular see of the Roman Catholic Church.

Its site is located near Dursunbey in Asiatic Turkey.

References

Populated places in ancient Mysia
Former populated places in Turkey
Catholic titular sees in Asia
History of Balıkesir Province
Hadrian
Populated places established in the 2nd century
Roman towns and cities in Turkey